The Swedish Forest Workers' Union (SSAF) was a trade union representing timber and forestry workers in Sweden.

The union was founded in 1918, as the Swedish Forest and Rafters' Union, on the initiative of the Ångermanland district of the Swedish Social Democratic Left Party.  Originally based in Sollefteå, it moved its headquarters to Gävle in 1920.  The following year, it affiliated to the Swedish Trade Union Confederation.

While the union only had 378 members at the end of 1918, it grew rapidly, and by 1924, membership had reached 19,254.  The early 1930s proved a particularly successful period, with the majority of members gaining coverage by collective agreements.  In 1934, 10,497 relevant workers transferred from the Swedish Sawmill Industry Workers' Union, and in 1938, membership reached an all-time high of 43,059.

In 1957, the union absorbed the small Swedish Timber Surveyors' Association, and in 1962 it adopted its final name, but membership was in long-term decline and by 1997 was down to only 12,160.  In 1998, it merged with the Swedish Wood Industry Workers' Union, to form the Swedish Forest and Wood Workers' Union.

References

Swedish Trade Union Confederation
Timber industry trade unions
Trade unions in Sweden
Trade unions established in 1918
Trade unions disestablished in 1998